Josiah Trimmingham (born 14 December 1996) is a Trinidadian professional footballer who most recently played as a defender for USL League One club Forward Madison FC.

Club career
Trimmingham has played club football for San Juan Jabloteh and Club Sando.

Trimmingham was signed by Forward Madison FC ahead of the 2020 season.

International career
Trimmingham made his international debut for Trinidad and Tobago in 2017.

References

1996 births
Living people
Trinidad and Tobago footballers
Trinidad and Tobago international footballers
San Juan Jabloteh F.C. players
Club Sando F.C. players
FC Miami City players
Forward Madison FC players
Association football midfielders
USL League Two players
Expatriate soccer players in the United States
Trinidad and Tobago expatriate footballers
Trinidad and Tobago expatriate sportspeople in the United States